Yaaradi Nee Mohini is a 2008 Indian Tamil-language romantic comedy film directed by Mithran Jawahar. It is a remake of the 2007 Telugu hit Selvaraghavan's Aadavari Matalaku Arthale Verule and stars Dhanush and Nayanthara in lead roles, whilst Karthik Kumar, Raghuvaran, Telugu film director K. Vishwanath, Karunas, and Saranya Mohan play supporting roles and slightly different climax. The music was scored by Yuvan Shankar Raja. The title is derived from a song from the 1958 Sivaji Ganesan-Padmini starrer  Uthama Puthiran.

Yaaradi Nee Mohini was released on 4 April 2008, becoming highly successful at the box office, emerging as one of the highest grossing Tamil films of the year.

Plot 
Vasudevan (Dhanush) is from a middle-class family. He makes several bids to obtain employment, but all goes in vain due to his poor English language skills and inadequate education qualifications. All his friends settle in life, but he continues to struggle in finding work. Vasu has two faithful friends named Cheenu (Karthik Kumar) and Ganesh (Karunas). His father (Raghuvaran), who is a teacher, is always critical of him for being an irresponsible person. This adds to his woes.

At this juncture, Vasu glimpses a woman named Keerthi (Nayanthara) and immediately falls in love with her. He learns that she works for a software solutions firm. Luckily for him, Vasu secures employment in the same firm after completing several interviews. Keerthi eventually turns out to be a short-tempered young woman. On a business trip, Vasu accompanies her with two other colleagues (including Manobala), to Australia. Here he reveals his feelings of love to her. She immediately turns him down, saying that she comes from an Orthodox family, and her marriage has already been arranged with her uncle's son.

A depressed Vasu returns to India thereafter. Unable to see his son in depression, his father decides to meet Keerthi. She abuses him for recommending his son's love and accidentally slaps Vasu and his father. Later that night, Vasu's father dies of heart attack. To help change Vasu's mood, Cheenu persuades him to come to his family house in the country. Coincidentally, on the train journey, Keerthi is revealed to be Cheenu's fiance. However, their grandfather's (K. Viswanath) thoughts of getting them married earlier are put aside because Cheenu and Keerthi leave the house to have their own identity. This causes heartburn to their grandfather.

With the passing of a few days, Keerthi and Cheenu's parents decide to get them married to appease their grandfather. After several turns of events, Keerthi realizes that she is in love with Vasu instead. Vasu asks her to forget him because he believes that it would create problems in their happy family. Cheenu overhears their midnight conversation. During the wedding, Cheenu tries to force Vasu and Keerthi to confess their relationship to everyone. But when they hesitate to do so, Cheenu stops the marriage himself, by lying to his elders that he has a secret wife in Chennai. When Cheenu comes under fire from his relatives, Vasu tells them the truth and is driven out of the house. He is joined only by the grandma (Sukumari) of the house, who agrees to accompany him as she reminds Vasu of his late father.

In time, the rest of Cheenu and Keerthi's family comes to stay with him for a few days. But Cheenu's grandfather refuses to enter the house, telling Vasu he is still angry with him and needs time to change himself somehow. The movie ends when Vasu and Keerthi becoming a couple and live together happily.

Cast 

Dhanush as Vasudevan "Vasu"
Nayanthara as Komalavalli (Keerthi)
Raghuvaran as Vasu's Father
Karthik Kumar as Cheenu
K. Vishwanath as Krishnamoorthy, Keerthi's Grandfather
Karunas as Ganesh
Saranya Mohan as Anandhavalli (Pooja)
Sukumari as Sharadha
Rajyalakshmi as Mani
Vanitha Krishnachandran as Godavari
Manobala as Balu
Crane Manohar as a villager
Nandha Saravanan as a villager
Rachana Maurya (special appearance in the song "Nenjai Kasakki")
Japan Kumar (special appearance in the song "Nenjai Kasakki")
Ragasya  (special appearance in the song "Oh Baby")

Production 
Mithran Jawahar, an associate of Selvaraghavan, made his directional debut with this film, which is a remake of Selvaraghavan's Telugu film Aadavari Matalaku Arthale Verule (2007), while Jyothika was offered the female lead role,but she opted out of the contract due to her wedding arrangements and plans. She was later replaced by Nayanthara.

Soundtrack 

The music of Yaaradi Nee Mohini was scored by Yuvan Shankar Raja, who had composed the music for the original film as well. The first release of the soundtrack, released on 9 February 2008, contained five tracks, which were all retained from the original version with the song "Manasa Manninchamma" missing initially. Later a version of "Paalakattu Pakkathile" from Vietnam Veedu (1970) remixed by D. Imman was recorded and included in the film; the producers decided to bring out a second release. This release features 16 tracks, including the earlier released five songs, two more versions of the song "Engeyo Paartha" (sung by Karthik and Naveen, respectively), two more remixes of the song "Paalakattu Pakkathile" (remixed by Dharan), the Tamil version of "Manasa Manninchamma", "Penne Ennai Kodu", the song "The Person Is The Looser", which runs during the opening credits apart from four "film score tracks". The lyrics were provided by Na. Muthukumar.

Release 
The satellite rights of the film were sold to the channel Sun TV. it was dubbed in malayalam as same title of this name and it was telecasted on Zee Keralam.

The film was also dubbed and released in Hindi as Phir Aaya Deewana in 2013.

Reception 
Behindwoods wrote "Yaaradi Nee Moghini is smartly packaged with everything inevitable in a Dhanush movie. With subdued emotions that hardly ever go overboard and in your face humor, director A. Jawahar gets everything right. Well, almost". Sify wrote "If you like feel-good love stories mixed with a lot of comedy and sentiments then, Yaaradi Nee Mohini is an ideal treat for the entire family. All credits go to debutant director Jawahar, Selvaraghavan?s long time associate for remaking his guru?s Telugu super-hit Adavari Matalaku Ardhalu Verule into Tamil. It is a well packaged film that will appeal to a broad spectrum of audiences". Rediff wrote "The movie is another example of a familiar story making a good watch simply because it's been made differently".

Box office 
It was one of the most successful Tamil films of the year.

References

External links 
 

2008 films
Indian romantic drama films
Tamil remakes of Telugu films
2000s Tamil-language films
Films shot in Thailand
Films scored by Yuvan Shankar Raja
Films scored by Dharan Kumar
Films scored by D. Imman
Films directed by Mithran R. Jawahar